Mordellistena longevittata is a beetle in the genus Mordellistena of the family Mordellidae. It was described in 1925 by Maurice Pic.

References

longevittata
Beetles described in 1925
Beetles of Asia
Insects of Malaysia